The NBA Finals is the championship series for the National Basketball Association (NBA) held at the conclusion of its postseason. All Finals have been played in a best-of-seven format, and are contested between the winners of the Eastern Conference and the Western Conference (formerly Divisions before 1970), except in  when the Eastern Division champion faced the winner between the Western and Central Division champions. From 1946 through 1949, when the league was known as the Basketball Association of America (BAA), the playoffs were a three-stage tournament where the two semifinal winners played each other in the finals. The winning team of the series receives the Larry O'Brien Championship Trophy.

The current home-and-away format in the NBA Finals is 2–2–1–1–1 (the team with the better regular-season record plays on its home court in Games 1, 2, 5, and 7), which has been used in –, –, –, –, –, –, and –present.
 
, the Eastern Conference/Division led the Western Conference/Division 40–36 in championships won. , the Boston Celtics and the Minneapolis/Los Angeles Lakers have won a combined total of 34 NBA championships (with 17 apiece). , the defending champions are the Golden State Warriors.

Champions
 The first parentheses in the Western champions and Eastern champions columns indicate the teams' playoff seed. The second parentheses indicate the number of times that teams have appeared in an NBA Finals as well as each respective team's NBA Finals record to date.
 As of 2022, of the 76 NBA Finals series played, the Eastern champions have won 40 titles while the Western champions have won 36 titles.

Results by team

Frequent matchups

See also

 List of ABA champions
 List of National Basketball Association longest winning streaks
 List of National Basketball League (United States) champions
 List of NBA championship head coaches
 List of NBA franchise post-season droughts
 List of NBA franchise post-season streaks
 List of NBA G League champions
 List of NBA players with most championships
 NBA Finals Most Valuable Player Award

Notes

References

External links

 NBA.com: List of champions

Champions
Champions
NBA